Şarkışla is a town in the Central Anatolian Sivas Province of Turkey. The mayor is Ahmet Turgay Oğuz (AKP).

2011 population of Şarkışla is 39.413.

Aşık Veysel, one of the most famous Turkish folk poets and folk music singers of the 20th century were born in Şarkışla, as well as another earlier poet (19th century) named Aşık Sefil Kanberi. The well known Turkish originated female Dutch politician Nebahat Albayrak was born (1968) in Maksutlu village of this town as well.

Şarkışla has all the characteristics of Central Anatolian climate in all seasons. The weather is mostly sunny and dry, and the clouds are high. In the summer time, it is a better place to live in and in the winter it is very cold here.

There are plenty of dams constructed in and around the town, which are used for agricultural and recreational needs. A recently constructed Baku–Tbilisi–Ceyhan pipeline is crossing by Şarkışla.

The history of this town is very old. Şarkışla is known to be populated since the ancient time of the Romans. A historical high castle still exists in the middle of the town.

During the last decades, many residents emigrated from this region to settle abroad. Anatolian cultural motives can be seen here. A rich Turkish cuisine and variety of regional foods and meals are found here.

References

See also
 Aşık Veysel
 Aşık Veysel Meslek Yüksekokulu

Populated places in Sivas Province
Districts of Sivas Province